Mark "Mickey" Appleman (born July 15, 1945) is an American professional poker player, sports bettor, and sports handicapper now living in Fort Lee, New Jersey.  His poker accomplishments include winning four WSOP bracelets, all in different variations of poker and four top 25 finishes in the WSOP Main Event.

Early life
Appleman was born on July 15, 1945, in Brooklyn, New York, to parents of Ashkenazi Jewish descent. He grew up in Long Island, where he was strong in both athletics and academics. He received his undergraduate degree in mathematics from Ohio State University, where he was a member of Alpha Epsilon Pi. He also earned an MBA in statistics from Case Western University.

Career

Education career
Appleman later moved to Washington, D.C., where he worked as a coordinator in a drug rehabilitation clinic. He also taught math in public schools.

Poker
Appleman used money he had made from sports betting to fund his early poker career, and he began playing at the World Series of Poker (WSOP) in 1975. He was a regular player at the Mayfair Club in New York City, where he played against some of the now very famous and successful poker players like Dan Harrington, Howard Lederer, and Erik Seidel.

In his long career as a professional poker player, he has won four bracelets and has finished in the money of the $10,000 no limit hold'em main event in 1987 (8th), 1989 (22nd), 1990 (20th), and 2000 (9th).

In 2008, Appleman appeared on NBC's Poker After Dark show in the episode "Mayfair Club."  The other players were the former owner of the club, Mike Shictman, and professional poker players Howard Lederer, Dan Harrington, Steve Zolotow, and Jay Heimowitz who won the tournament and the $120,000 cash prize.  Appleman finished the tournament in third place.

As of 2015, his total live tournament winnings exceed $1,787,000. His 47 cashes at the WSOP account for $1,185,861 of those winnings.

World Series of Poker Bracelets

Personal life 
Mickey has a son, Alexander, who was born in 1987.

Notes

External links
Interview by Nolan Dalla
Hendon Mob tournament results
The Jesus of Handicapping by Michael Kaplan
Personal Website

Living people
20th-century American Jews
American poker players
World Series of Poker bracelet winners
Super Bowl of Poker event winners
People from Long Island
People from Washington, D.C.
People from Fort Lee, New Jersey
1945 births
Ohio State University College of Arts and Sciences alumni
Case Western Reserve University alumni
21st-century American Jews
American Ashkenazi Jews